Sophie Baggaley (born 29 November 1996) is an English professional footballer who plays as a goalkeeper for Manchester United in the Women's Super League.

She has previously played for Birmingham City and Bristol City, and has been capped internationally by England at youth level. In 2019, Baggaley won FA WFA Players' Player of the Year and was named in the PFA Team of the Year.

Career

Early career 
Born in Newton, Derbyshire, Baggaley first became a goalkeeper by chance, volunteering for the position when the boys' team she was playing for found itself short of one for a game. She came through the Derby County Centre of Excellence.

Birmingham City 
Baggaley moved to the Birmingham City academy in June 2013. In 2014 she was promoted to the senior team as a backup to Rebecca Spencer, named as an unused substitute for all 14 WSL matches. She made her senior debut on 1 May 2014 in a 2–1 win over Yeovil Town in the League Cup group stage and made her only other appearance of the season in the same competition against second division Oxford United. During the 2015 season, Baggaley started four WSL games, conceding only one goal to Arsenal, and grew in her role as cup keeper, playing five League Cup games. Following the departure of Spencer to Chelsea in January 2016, Baggaley began the 2016 season as the undisputed starter. However, the arrival of Germany international Ann-Katrin Berger from Paris Saint-Germain in June 2016 meant Baggaley only played in 3 of the remaining 9 WSL fixtures that season.

Bristol City 
Having been appointed Birmingham manager in December 2016, Marc Skinner announced Berger as first choice keeper and encouraged Baggaley to go out on loan to play first-team football. She joined Bristol City on a season-long loan in August 2017 ahead of the incumbent Caitlin Leach and Aimee Watson. She started 17 of 18 WSL matches. At the end of the season, Baggaley won The FA Women's Football Awards Save of the Year for a save against Arsenal's Jordan Nobbs.

She permanently joined Bristol City in the summer of 2018. In September 2018, Baggaley was awarded both the FA WSL Player of the Month and the inaugural FA WSL PFA Fans Player of the Month. She won the award again in January 2019. At the end of the 2018–19 season she won the FA WFA Players' Player of the Year award and was named in the PFA Team of the Year having kept six clean sheets, helping Bristol to 6th place, their best finish since 2013.

The following two seasons, Baggaley led the league in saves with 70 and 95 respectively as Bristol City struggled to cope defensively against the league's top sides. Most notably, Bristol were on the receiving end of a record 11–1 defeat at the hands of Arsenal in December 2019. The following season Bristol were beaten 9–0 by Chelsea and 8–1 by Manchester City. During the 2020–21 season Bristol reached the final of the 2020–21 League Cup for the first time in their history, but were beaten 6–0 by Chelsea. Baggaley left Bristol City in July 2021 after their relegation to the Championship.

Manchester United
On 23 July 2021, Baggaley signed with Manchester United on a two-year contract with an additional option year. Having started the season as a backup to Mary Earps in the league, Baggaley made her club debut on 14 October 2021 in a 2–2 away draw with Championship side Durham in the 2021–22 League Cup group stage opener. Manchester United took the bonus point with a 5–3 penalty shootout victory.

International career
Baggaley has played for the England team at every age grouping up to under 23 level. In October 2016, Baggaley was called up to the senior England national team for the first time for a friendly against Spain but was an unused substitute behind Karen Bardsley and Mary Earps. Having not been named to the next three England squads, Baggaley was recalled in April 2017 for friendlies against Italy and Austria but was again unused behind veteran Siobhan Chamberlain. Much discussion was made of the lack of chances Baggaley had for England with Phil Neville preferring the likes of older veterans Bardsley, Earps, Chamberlain and Telford despite some resigned to backup roles at club level. By 2019, younger goalkeepers Ellie Roebuck, Sandy MacIver and Hannah Hampton had all also claimed starting jobs at WSL clubs and entered the England rotation ahead of Baggaley.

Personal life
Baggaley attended Tibshelf Community School from 2009 to 2013 and later Solihull Sixth Form College where she attained As and A*s in her A-Levels before enrolling at the University of Birmingham to study physiotherapy. In 2019 she became an ambassador for the sports bra firm ShockAbsorber.

Career statistics

Club

Honours 
Birmingham City
FA Women's League Cup runner-up: 2016
Women's FA Cup runner-up: 2017

Bristol City
FA Women's League Cup runner-up: 2021
Individual
FA WSL PFA Team of the Year: 2018–19
FA Women's Football Awards WSL Players' Player of the Year: 2018–19

References

External links
 Profile at the Bristol City F.C. website 
 
 

Living people
1996 births
English women's footballers
Women's association football goalkeepers
Women's Super League players
Birmingham City W.F.C. players
Bristol City W.F.C. players
Manchester United W.F.C. players
England women's under-23 international footballers